Riti Urmasca or Ritiurcamasca (possibly from Quechua rit'i snow, urmasqa fallen down, "snow fallen down") is a mountain in the Andes of Peru, about  high. It is situated in the Puno Region, Putina Province, on the border of the districts Ananea and Sina. Riti Urmasca lies southeast of the mountain Ritipata and southwest of Chaupi Orco at the mountain pass Iscaycruz (possibly from  Quechua iskay two, Spanish cruz cross, "two crosses").

References

Mountains of Peru
Mountains of Puno Region